Iván Alejandro Pavón (born 3 April 1998) is an Argentine professional footballer who plays as a defender.

Career
Pavón's career began with Barracas Central. In 2017, Pavón completed a loan move to Primera D Metropolitana's Yupanqui. Four matches followed. In 2018, Pavón was loaned out for a second time - joining Deportivo Español of Primera B Metropolitana. He made his first appearances for them in November 2018 against Justo José de Urquiza and Almirante Brown, with further appearances versus Deportivo Riestra and Acassuso following across the next six months as they were relegated.

Career statistics
.

References

External links

1998 births
Living people
Place of birth missing (living people)
Argentine footballers
Association football defenders
Primera D Metropolitana players
Primera B Metropolitana players
Barracas Central players
Club Social y Deportivo Yupanqui players
Deportivo Español footballers